

The Elias EC-1 Aircoupe was an American two-seat parasol wing monoplane designed and built by Elias of Buffalo, New York.

Design and development
The EC-1 Aircoupe was a parasol wing monoplane powered by an  Anzani engine which first flew in 1928.  Designed by Joseph Cato, it had an open cockpit with a removable cabin enclosure. The airplane was known as the Airsport when flown without the cabin enclosure. The EC-1 was also available with a  Kinner K-5 engine. One prototype is known, but more may have been produced.

Specifications

References

Notes

Bibliography

1920s United States civil utility aircraft
EC-1
Parasol-wing aircraft
Aircraft first flown in 1928